Brookfield Township is one of the fifteen townships of Noble County, Ohio, United States.  The 2000 census found 119 people in the township.

Geography
Located in the western part of the county, it borders the following townships:
Spencer Township, Guernsey County - north
Noble Township - east
Sharon Township - southeast
Manchester Township, Morgan County - south
Bristol Township, Morgan County - southwest corner
Meigs Township, Muskingum County - west
Rich Hill Township, Muskingum County - northwest corner

The most westerly township in Noble County, it is the only county township to border Morgan County.

No municipalities are located in Brookfield Township.

Name and history
Statewide, the only other Brookfield Township is located in Trumbull County.

Government
The township is governed by a three-member board of trustees, who are elected in November of odd-numbered years to a four-year term beginning on the following January 1. Two are elected in the year after the presidential election and one is elected in the year before it. There is also an elected township fiscal officer, who serves a four-year term beginning on April 1 of the year after the election, which is held in November of the year before the presidential election. Vacancies in the fiscal officership or on the board of trustees are filled by the remaining trustees.

References

External links
Noble County Chamber of Commerce 

Townships in Noble County, Ohio
Townships in Ohio